Aztec Pass is a gap and a valley between the Juniper Mountains and Santa Maria Mountains in Yavapai County, Arizona, United States. The summit of the pass is at an elevation of 6,232 feet, at  the divide between Muddy Wash on the west and Walnut Creek on the east.

History
Aztec Pass was the route of the wagon toll road, known as the Hardyville - Prescott Road built by William Harrison Hardy in 1864, from his steamboat landing at Hardyville to new Arizona territorial capital of Prescott, through the Juniper and Santa Maria Mountains. The western entrance was the location of a campground known as Oaks and Willows on Muddy Wash. The eastern entrance of the road into the pass was the location of the Old Toll Gate 6 miles east of the summit. The toll gate was moved 3 miles eastward after Hardy improved the route through the pass.

References

Landforms of Yavapai County, Arizona
Mountain passes of Arizona